The Woman with Dog's Eyes is a play by the Australian writer Louis Nowra. It is the first part of the Boyce trilogy written for the Griffin Theatre Company at the behest of its Artistic Director David Berthold. The other two plays are The Marvellous Boy (2005) and The Emperor of Sydney (2006). The play is a single continuous scene set in a large Edwardian hotel room in the Blue Mountains.

It was first performed at the SBW Stables on 1 October 2004 with the following cast:

Malcolm Boyce: Danny Adcock
Penny, his wife: Jane Harders
Keith, his eldest son: Jack Finsterer
Todd, his middle son: Alex Dimitriades
Luke, his youngest son: Toby Schmitz
Alice, their neighbour: Cate Blanchett

The production:
Director: David Berthold
Designer: Nicholas Dare
Lighting designer: Matt Marshall

The play concerns struggles for love, power and happiness within a family. It uses the 1949 song Some Enchanted Evening.

Nowra says the play's conception was in hotels such as the Hydro-Majestic. On a night of the Winter Solstice he met a less than happy couple who were having a fortieth wedding anniversary at the Hotel Carrington, with firecrackers and a swing band.

References

Nowra, Louis, The Boyce Trilogy, Sydney: Currency Press, 2007.

External links

 Variety review
 Interview with actor Alex Dimitriades
 Currency Press, The Boyce Trilogy

Plays by Louis Nowra
2004 plays